Noguera may refer to:

 Noguera (comarca) is one of the Comarques of Catalonia (Spain)
 Noguera (surname), a surname
 Noguera Pallaresa and Noguera Ribagorçana are rivers tributary to the river Segre, in Catalonia, Spain.
 Noguera de Albarracín, a town in Aragon, Spain.